Women Bathing or Bathers (French - Baigneuses) is a c.1900 oil on canvas painting by Paul Cézanne, now in the Ny Carlsberg Glyptotek in Copenhagen. Individual or grouped male or female bathers were a major theme in his work from the 1870s onwards, most notably his so-called Big Bathers.

See also
List of paintings by Paul Cézanne

References

1900 paintings
Paintings by Paul Cézanne
Paintings in the collection of the Ny Carlsberg Glyptotek
Nude art
Bathing in art